Manic Miner is a platform video game written for the ZX Spectrum by Matthew Smith. It was published by Bug-Byte in 1983, then later the same year by Software Projects. The first game in the Miner Willy series, the design was inspired by Miner 2049er (1982) for the Atari 8-bit family. Retro Gamer called Manic Miner one of the most influential platform games of all time, and it has been ported to numerous home computers, video game consoles, and mobile phones.

Gameplay

In each of the twenty caverns, each one screen in size, are several flashing objects, which the player must collect before Willy's oxygen supply runs out. Once the player has collected the objects in one cavern, they must then go to the now-flashing portal, which will take them to the next cavern. The player must avoid enemies, listed in the cassette inlay as "...Poisonous Pansies, Spiders, Slime, and worst of all, Manic Mining Robots..." which move along predefined paths at constant speeds. Willy can also be killed by falling too far, so players must time the precision of jumps and other movements to prevent such falls or collisions with the enemies.

Extra lives are gained every 10,000 points, and the game ends when the player has no lives left. Above the final portal is a garden. To the right is a house with a white picket fence and red car parked in front. To the left is a slope leading to backyard with a pond and tree; a white animal, resembling a cat or mouse, watches the sun set behind the pond. Upon gaining his freedom, the game restarts from the first level with no increase in difficulty.

The in-game music is In the Hall of the Mountain King from Edvard Grieg's music to Henrik Ibsen's play Peer Gynt. The music that plays during the title screen is an arrangement of The Blue Danube.

Release
There are some differences between the Bug-Byte and Software Projects versions. 

 In Processing Plant, the enemy at the end of the conveyor belt is a bush in the original, whereas the Software Projects one resembles a Pac-Man ghost.
 In Amoebatrons' Revenge, the original Bug-Byte amoebatrons look like alien octopuses with tentacles hanging down, whereas the Software Projects amoebatrons resemble the Bug-Byte logo.
 In The Warehouse, the original game has threshers travelling up and down the vertical slots, rotating about the screen's X-axis. The Software Projects version has Penrose triangles (i.e. the Software Projects logo) instead, which rotate about the screen's Z-axis.
 The Bug-Byte cheat code was the numerical sequence "6031769" - based on Matthew Smith's driving licence. In the Software Projects version this changed to "typewriter". The numerical sequence "6031769" was later used as cheat code (infinite lives) for the PC version of Grand Theft Auto.

Ports

The game was officially ported to the Commodore 64, Commodore 16, Amstrad CPC, BBC Micro, Dragon 32/64, Amiga, Oric 1, Game Boy Advance, MSX, SAM Coupé, mobile.

SAM Coupé

The SAM Coupé version, programmed by Matthew Holt, like the ZX original requires pixel-perfect timing, and both graphics and audio, the latter by František Fuka, were greatly updated. In addition to the original twenty caverns, forty additional caverns were included in this release. Levels were designed by David Ledbury, and winners of a competition run by SAM Computers Ltd.

PMD 85
The game was ported for Czechoslovak Computers PMD 85 in 1985. The authors of the PMD 85 version are Vít Libovický and Daniel Jenne. They made it as accurate as they could.

BBC Micro
The BBC Micro version does not have the Solar Power Generator, instead containing a completely different room called "The Meteor Shower". This has the "reflecting machines" from the Solar Power Generator, but there is no beam of light. Instead, it has meteors which descend from the top of the screen and disintegrate when they hit platforms, like the Skylabs in Skylab Landing Bay. It also has forcefields which turn on and off, and the layout is completely different.

Also, the very last screen (which is still called The Final Barrier) is complex and difficult (unlike the Spectrum version, which is considered to be fairly easy) and has a completely different layout. It also features the blinking forcefields.

Amstrad CPC
The Amstrad version was effectively the same as the Spectrum version by Software Projects, except that Eugene's Lair was renamed "Eugene Was Here," and the layout of The Final Barrier was again completely different (but is more similar to the Spectrum version than the BBC version).

Dragon 32/64

The Dragon 32 version, programmed by Roy Coates, had two extra rooms (i.e. 22 altogether) and a cheat mode accessed by typing "P", "P", "ENGUIN". To retain the resolution of the original, the Dragon version used PMODE 4 in black/white mode.

Oric/Atmos
Programmed by Chris Larkin, the Oric version has 32 screens instead of 20.

Commodore 16
The Commodore 16 version was limited in a number of respects - this was mainly due to the initial lack of developer material for the C16 machine, and a two-week deadline to produce and test the game, then generate a master tape for the duplication house.
Other issues related to the lack of a fast loader system for the C16 cassette deck, as a result it took about seven minutes for the game to load, and a bug resulted in the game entering the first screen as soon as the tape had finished loading instead of waiting for the user to start the game. Further issues related to the lack of music and in game sound, and the way that video memory was mapped in the C16, this resulted in a number of the screens having to be removed so that load time and video mapping could be correctly handled.

Reception
In August 1983, sales of Bug-Byte's original ZX Spectrum release of Manic Miner took the game to the top of the UK video games charts replacing Jet Pac. 
The Commodore 64 version, released by Software Projects, reached the number one position in early 1984. It went on to become the best selling Commodore 64 game and third best selling ZX Spectrum game of 1984.

The SAM Coupé version scored 84% in Your Sinclair and 88% in Crash.

Manic Miner was the winner of "Best Arcade Style Game", and placed third in the "Game of the Year" category at the 1983 Golden Joystick Awards voted for by readers of Computer and Video Games magazine. 
Manic Miner was placed at number 25 in the "Your Sinclair official top 100" Spectrum games of all time, and was later voted number 6 in the Readers' Top 100 Games of All Time.

In 1991, ACE magazine listed Manic Miner and its sequel Jet Set Willy, along with Hunchback, Impossible Mission, and the Mario series, as the greatest platform games of all time calling  Manic Miner "the first great home computer platform game".

The game was #97 on Polygon's 2017 retrospective list of the 500 best games of all time.

Legacy 
Unofficial ports exist for Microsoft Windows, MS-DOS, Linux, Macintosh, Atari ST, ZX81, TRS-80 Color Computer, PlayStation, Nintendo 64, Neo Geo Pocket Color, Acorn Archimedes, Orao, Cambridge Z88, PMD 85, HP48, Zune, Acorn Atom, Acorn Electron, Commodore 128, and VIC-20.

The sequel to Manic Miner is Jet Set Willy, and it was followed by Jet Set Willy II. Software Projects also released a game in the style of Manic Miner for the VIC-20 called The Perils of Willy.

Manic Miner 360 was released for the Xbox 360 as an Xbox Live Indie Game 21 June, 2012.

A homage to the Manic Miner loading screen appears in one episode of the 2005 British sitcom Nathan Barley.

See also
 Miner Willy series of games
 Roller Coaster
 Miner 2049er
 Blagger
 Sir Lancelot

References

External links 
 
 

 Complete video from the C64 Version on archive.org
 Retro Gamer Magazine: The Making Of Manic Miner
 HTML5 version
Android Orao emulator containing Manic Miner

1983 video games
Amiga games
Amstrad CPC games
BBC Micro and Acorn Electron games
Commodore 16 and Plus/4 games
Commodore 64 games
Dragon 32 games
Game Boy Advance games
Golden Joystick Award winners
Mobile games
MSX games
Oric games
Platform games
PMD 85 games
SAM Coupé games
Video games developed in the United Kingdom
Video games set in the United Kingdom
ZX Spectrum games
Software Projects games
Single-player video games
Bug-Byte Software games
Amsoft games